Thoasia manu, the Río Manú pentagonal arboreal carabid, is a species of beetle in the family Carabidae. It is found in Amazonian lowlands, Perú and Yasuní region of Ecuador.

Description
They are macropterous and capable of flight. Standard body length is 3.91–4.77 mm. Elytra entirely metallic blue. Forebody and head shiny flavous. Pronotum moderately narrow. Abdomen Sparsely setiferous.

References

Lebiinae
Beetles described in 2018